The National Party of the Upper House, commonly known as the National Party, was a conservative political party in the upper house of Swedish parliament, formed in 1912 through the merging of the United Right Party and the Moderate Party of the Upper House. In 1935 the party merged into the parliamentary group of the General Electoral Union, together with the Lantmanna and Bourgeois Party.

Leaders 
 Gottfrid Billing, 1912–1913
 Ernst Trygger, 1913–1923
 Johan Nilsson, 1923
 Axel Vennersten, 1924
 Ernst Trygger, 1924–1933
 Johan Bernhard Johansson, 1933–1935

References

1912 establishments in Sweden
1935 disestablishments in Sweden
Defunct political parties in Sweden
Conservative parties in Sweden
Moderate Party
Political parties established in 1912
Political parties disestablished in 1935